The Departmental Council of Ardennes is the deliberative assembly of the French department of the Ardennes. Its headquarters are in Charleville-Mézières.

Executive

President 
The president of the departmental council of Ardennes is Noël Bourgeois (DVD) since October 16, 2017.

Vice-presidents

Departmental councillors 
The Departmental Council of Ardennes includes 38 departmental councilors from the 19 cantons of Ardennes.

References 

Ardennes
Ardennes (department)